The 2019 Adamawa State gubernatorial election occurred in Nigeria on March 9, 2019. PDP candidate Ahmadu Umaru Fintiri won the election, defeating Bindo Jibrilla of the APC.

Ahmadu Umaru Fintiri emerged PDP gubernatorial candidate after scoring 1,656 votes and defeating his closest rival, Mohammed Jameel who received 465 votes. He picked Martins Babale as his running mate. Bindo Jibrilla was the APC candidate with Crowther Seth as his running mate. 29 candidates contested in the election.

Electoral system
The Governor of Adamawa State is elected using the plurality voting system.

Primary election

PDP primary
The PDP primary election was held on September 30, 2018. Ahmadu Umaru Fintiri won the primary election polling 1,656 votes against 4 other candidates. His closest rival was Mohammed Jameel, who came second with 465 votes, Bala Ngilari scored 78 votes, Aliyu Umar scored 8 votes, while Garba Dankani had 1 vote.

APC primary
The APC primary election was held on October 4, 2018. Bindo Jibrilla won the primary election polling 193,656 votes against 2 other candidates. His closest rival was Halilu Ahmed who came second with 15,738 votes, while Malam Nuhu Ribadu came third with 8,364 votes.

Results
A total number of 29 candidates registered with the Independent National Electoral Commission to contest in the election.

The total number of registered voters in the state was 1,973,083, while 905,346 voters were accredited. Total number of votes cast was 899,097, while number of valid votes was 871,307. Rejected votes were 27,790.

By local government area
Here are the results of the election by local government area for the two major parties. The total valid votes of 871,307 represents the 29 political parties that participated in the election. Green represents LGAs won by Ahmadu Umaru Fintiri. Blue represents LGAs won by Bindo Jibrilla.

References 

Adamawa State gubernatorial election
Adamawa State gubernatorial election
Adamawa State gubernatorial elections
2019 Adamawa State elections